Pedro Manuel Guerrero (born December 3, 1988) is a Dominican former professional baseball infielder and current coach. He is the assistant hitting coach for the San Francisco Giants of Major League Baseball (MLB). He is the nephew of former MLB Manager Manny Acta.

Playing career
Guerrero was born in San Pedro de Macoris, Dominican Republic. He played professionally in the Los Angeles Dodgers organization from 2006 through 2013, playing as high as Class A+. He batted .236/.287/.351 with 23 home runs, 29 stolen bases, and 163 RBIs in 1,382 at bats over 411 games. He played 183 games at shortstop, 111 games at third base, 97 games at second base, and two games in left field.

Coaching career
Guerrero was the bench coach for the rookie-league Ogden Raptors from 2016–17, before being hired to be the assistant hitting coach for the Philadelphia Phillies, a role which he held through the 2021 season.

On November 9, 2021, Guerrero was hired by the San Francisco Giants to serve as the team's assistant hitting coach for the 2022 season.

References

External links

1988 births
Living people
Albuquerque Isotopes players
Baseball infielders
Chattanooga Lookouts players
Dominican Republic baseball coaches
Dominican Republic expatriate baseball players in the United States
Dominican Republic national baseball team people
Dominican Summer League Dodgers players
Great Lakes Loons players
Gulf Coast Dodgers players
Major League Baseball hitting coaches
Minor league baseball coaches
Ogden Raptors players
Philadelphia Phillies coaches
Rancho Cucamonga Quakes players
Sportspeople from San Pedro de Macorís